Tapinoma luridum is a species of ant in the genus Tapinoma. Described by Emery in 1908, the species is endemic to the Democratic Republic of Congo and Guinea.

References

Tapinoma
Hymenoptera of Africa
Insects described in 1908